Willoughby Hickman may refer to:

Sir Willoughby Hickman, 1st Baronet (1604–1650) of the Hickman Baronets
Sir Willoughby Hickman, 3rd Baronet (1659–1720) of the Hickman Baronets, MP for Kingston upon Hull
Willoughby Hickman (1688–1712), son of the 3rd Baronet and MP for East Retford

See also
Hickman (surname)